Abdenasser El Khayati (born 7 February 1989) is a Dutch professional footballer who plays as a winger for Indian Super League club Chennaiyin.

Career
Born in Rotterdam, El Khayati progressed through the youth academy of Excelsior, before joining the Feyenoord youth team in 2003 as part of their cooperation with Excelsior. He later moved to the youth department of RKSV Leonidas. El Khayati spent his early senior career in the Netherlands and Cyprus with PSV, FC Den Bosch, NAC Breda, Olympiakos Nicosia and Kozakken Boys. He made his professional debut with Den Bosch in the Eerste Divisie on 3 October 2008, in a match against Excelsior.

He signed for English club Burton Albion on 29 January 2015, before moving to Championship side Queens Park Rangers on a -year deal on 1 February 2016. He scored his first goal for QPR in a 2–1 home win against Charlton Athletic on 9 April 2016. He moved on loan to ADO Den Haag in January 2017.  On 23 August 2017 his QPR contract was terminated by mutual consent. Shortly after his QPR contract was terminated, he joined ADO Den Haag on a three-year contract.

After growing into a key player for ADO, El Khayati signed with Qatar SC on a two-year contract on 15 August 2019. The transfer came after a 2018–19 season, where he scored 17 goals and had 12 assists in the Eredivisie. On 19 October 2020, El Khayati left Qatar after his contract was terminated by mutual consent, effectively making him a free agent. He finished his stint in Qatar with 16 league appearances in which he scored one goal.

He returned to ADO Den Haag on 6 February 2021, signing a short-term contract until the end of the season.

On 11 March 2022, El Khayati signed with Willem II until the end of the 2021–22 season. On 30 September 2022, he signed with Indian Super League side Chennaiyin ahead of their 2022–23 season.

Personal life
El Khayati is of Moroccan descent.

Career statistics

Club

References

1989 births
Living people
Footballers from Rotterdam
Dutch footballers
Dutch sportspeople of Moroccan descent
Excelsior Rotterdam players
Feyenoord players
RKSV Leonidas players
PSV Eindhoven players
FC Den Bosch players
NAC Breda players
Olympiakos Nicosia players
Kozakken Boys players
Burton Albion F.C. players
Queens Park Rangers F.C. players
ADO Den Haag players
Qatar SC players
Willem II (football club) players
Eredivisie players
Eerste Divisie players
Derde Divisie players
English Football League players
Qatar Stars League players
Association football wingers
Association football forwards
Dutch expatriate footballers
Dutch expatriate sportspeople in Cyprus
Expatriate footballers in Cyprus
Dutch expatriate sportspeople in England
Expatriate footballers in England
Dutch expatriate sportspeople in Qatar
Expatriate footballers in Qatar
Dutch expatriate sportspeople in India
Expatriate footballers in India
Chennaiyin FC players